Skoczylas is a surname. Notable people with the surname include:

 Jan Skoczylas (born 1951), Polish equestrian
 Władysław Skoczylas (1883–1934), Polish artist
 Włodzimierz Skoczylas (1923–1993), Polish actor

See also
 

Polish-language surnames